Tolly is both a given name and a surname. Notable people with the name include:

Tolly Burkan (born 1948), firewalking spokesperson
Tolly Burnett (1923-1993), English cricketer
William Tolly (1715-1784), officer in British East India Company
Barclay de Tolly (Russian nobility), aristocratic family 
Michael Andreas Barclay de Tolly (1761-1818), German field-marshall
Emma Tolly, fictional character in Children of the Red King

See also
Tolly Lights, a 2008 Indian film
Tolly Cobbold, a former English brewing company